Findlay is a locality within the Rural Municipality of Sifton in southwestern Manitoba, Canada.  It is located approximately 34 kilometers (21 miles) southeast of Virden, Manitoba.

References 

Localities in Manitoba
Unincorporated communities in Westman Region